The 2011 flooding on the Musselshell River in Montana began about May 21, affecting large parts of central Montana.

Several roads in the Musselshell watershed were already closed by this date.

The town of Roundup suffered the most damage of any community along the Musselshell. Potable water, food, and medicine were major concerns. In Petroleum County alone damage costs were estimated at US$1.5 million.

By June 23, the Musselshell had receded back below its banks, FEMA had assessed damage to public lands and was back in Roundup to assess damage to private lands and properties.

Flooding on the unconnected Yellowstone River to the south prompted the closing of  a  portion of Interstate 90 from Livingston to Springdale. Floodwaters from the tributary Pryor creek led to closing of Pompeys Pillar National Monument. The Little Bighorn River and related tributaries flooded the area around Crow Agency and shut down Interstate 90 from Hardin to the Wyoming line for several days. Montana counties that were affected by the state-wide flooding in Spring 2011 include: Big Horn, Carbon, Garfield, Granite, Jefferson, Judith Basin, Missoula, Musselshell, Petroleum, Sanders, Wheatland, and Yellowstone. A state of emergency was declared in 51 Montana counties, cities, and Indian reservations. Flood waters from the Musselshell, Yellowstone, and several other Montana rivers flow into the Missouri River and Mississippi River, exacerbating the 2011 flooding in states such as North Dakota and South Dakota.

See also
 2011 Mississippi River floods
 2011 Missouri River Flood

References

External links
 Current and historic crest levels of the Musselshell MT USGS station
 Timeline of Musselshell history

Musselshell
Floods in Montana
Musselshell River flood